Brian Fobbs (born February 17, 1998) is an American professional basketball player for Kangoeroes Mechelen of the BNXT League. He played college basketball for Genesee Community College and Towson.

High school career
Fobbs attended Bishop Kearney High School in Irondequoit, New York. He was not the featured player on offense as a junior, averaging about seven points per game. As a senior, Fobbs averaged 10 points per game. He did not receive any notable collegiate offers, so he committed to Genesee Community College.

College career
As a sophomore at Genesee, Fobbs averaged 26.4 points and 12.7 rebounds per game. He had nine games in which he scored 30 or more points, including a single-game program record of 46 points. Fobbs was named NJCAA Division II First Team All-American. He signed with Towson over an offer from Robert Morris. On December 11, 2018,  he scored 32 points in an 80–76 overtime win against UMBC, including the game-winning three-pointer with 10.4 seconds left. Fobbs averaged 17.5 points and 5.9 rebounds per game as a junior, earning Second Team All-CAA honors. On December 10, 2019, he scored a career-high 33 points and hit seven three-pointers in a 77–71 win against UMBC. As a senior, Fobbs averaged 16.3 points and 4.9 rebounds per game. He was again named to the Second Team All-CAA. Fobbs finished his career with 1,083 points at Towson, becoming the first junior college transfer to score over 1,000 points since 1978.

Professional career
On September 13, 2021, Fobbs signed his first professional contract with the Vilpas Vikings of the Korisliiga.

On July 12, 2022, he has signed with Kangoeroes Mechelen of the BNXT League.

Personal life
Fobbs is the son of Joseph and Monica Fobbs. He has a sister, Briana. Fobbs cites LeBron James as his role model.

References

External links
 Towson Tigers bio

1998 births
Living people
American men's basketball players
Basketball players from New York (state)
Junior college men's basketball players in the United States
Kangoeroes Basket Mechelen players
Shooting guards
Sportspeople from Rochester, New York
Towson Tigers men's basketball players